Strizhi may refer to:
Swifts (aerobatic team) (Strizhi), a Russian aerobatic performance demonstrator team
Strizhi (inhabited locality), name of several inhabited localities in Russia